Up and under may refer to:

 Another name for the bomb, a type of kick in various codes of football
 Up and under, a basketball move
 Up 'n' Under, play by English playwright, John Godber
 Up 'n' Under II, sequel to the play by John Godber
 Up 'n' Under (film), film adaptation directed by John Godber